Zu/Iceburn is a self-titled 10" split album by Italian band Zu and the American post-hardcore band Iceburn, released in 2006, as Phonometak n. 1, part of the Split 10" Series by SoundMetak, an experimental music laboratory in Milan.

Track listing
Zu With Xabier Iriondo - Side A
A1 Big Sea Warnings [1:48]
A2 Momentum [4:31]
A3 3 Rivers Conjunction [1:37]
A4 How We're Being Manipulated [3:07]
A5 It's Irrelevant Now [3:13]

Iceburn - Side B
B1 Odin's Beard [3:13]
B2 Swallow Mighty Earth [2:52]
B3 1000 Miles Stallion [4:11]
B4 Shaolin Taco [1:52]

References 

Zu (band) albums
2006 albums
Iceburn albums
Split albums